Cynthia Vera Hope Strachan (born 1 December 1960) is a Bahamian Progressive Liberal Party politician who was the  Member of Parliament (MP) for Sea Breeze from 2012 to 2017. Strachan served in the Perry Christie cabinet as Minister of Financial Services and Local Government. She also oversaw Trade and Industry.

Early life and education 
Hope Strachan was born on the island of New Providence in The Bahamas to Eric and Maxine (Adderley) Ingraham. Strachan was the granddaughter of Mary Naomie Ingraham, who during the 1960s worked to gain suffrage (the right to vote) for Bahamian women.

Strachan obtained an LL.B. (Honours) degree from the University of London, United Kingdom. She was admitted to the Bar of England, Wales, and The Bahamas in 1989.

Career

Legal 
Strachan currently  has a civil and commercial law practice under the name Hope Strachan & Co.

References

1960 births
Living people
People from New Providence
Members of the Senate of the Bahamas
Government ministers of the Bahamas
Progressive Liberal Party politicians
Women government ministers of the Bahamas
21st-century Bahamian women politicians
21st-century Bahamian politicians
20th-century Bahamian lawyers
20th-century women lawyers
21st-century Bahamian lawyers